This article lists the presidents of the People's Assembly of Bosnia and Herzegovina.

List

See also
Parliamentary Assembly of Bosnia and Herzegovina

Parliamentary Assembly of Bosnia and Herzegovina
Bosnia and Herzegovina, People's Assembly